The pouakai or poukai is a monstrous bird in Māori mythology.

Mythologies
In some of these legends, pouakai kill and eat humans.

History
Haast's eagles, which only lived in the east and northwest of New Zealand's South Island, did not become extinct until around two hundred years after the arrival of Māori. Eagles are depicted in early rock-shelter paintings in South Canterbury. Large amounts of the eagle's lowland habitat had been destroyed by burning by A.D. 1350, and it was driven extinct by overhunting, both directly (Haast's eagle bones have been found in Māori archaeological sites) and indirectly: its main prey species, nine species of moa and other large birds such as adzebills, flightless ducks, and flightless geese, were hunted to extinction at the same time.

See also
 Hakawai
 Folk memory

References

Mythological birds of prey
Māori legendary creatures